Mauno Uusivirta (born 27 September 1948) is a Finnish former racing cyclist. He won the Finnish national road race title in 1970. He also competed at the 1968, 1972 and 1980 Summer Olympics.

References

External links
 

1948 births
Living people
People from Toholampi
Finnish male cyclists
Olympic cyclists of Finland
Cyclists at the 1968 Summer Olympics
Cyclists at the 1972 Summer Olympics
Cyclists at the 1980 Summer Olympics
Sportspeople from Central Ostrobothnia